Uleanthus erythrinoides is a species of flowering plants in the family Fabaceae. It belongs to the subfamily Faboideae. It is the only member of the genus Uleanthus. The species occurs in Brazil.

References

Angylocalyceae
Monotypic Fabaceae genera